Jean Francis Ferry Mendoua (born 6 November 1982 in Ngaoundéré) is a professional Cameroonian footballer currently playing for RCA Casablanca.

References

1982 births
Living people
Cameroonian footballers
Coton Sport FC de Garoua players
JS Centre Salif Keita players
Expatriate footballers in Mali
People from Ngaoundéré
Association football midfielders